The Van Buren Confederate Monument is located in front of the Crawford County Courthouse in Van Buren, Arkansas. Built in 1899 by the Mary Lee Chapter of the United Daughters of the Confederacy, the structure was initially erected in Fairview Cemetery. Honoring Confederate dead from the Battle of Pea Ridge, Battle of Prairie Grove, and the Battle of Wilson's Creek, the Sons of the Confederacy requested the memorial be relocated to the courthouse lawn in 1906, and it has remained there ever since. The monument was listed on the National Register of Historic Places in 1996 as part of the Civil War Commemorative Sculpture Multiple Property Submission.

See also
 1899 in art
 List of Confederate monuments and memorials
 Van Buren Historic District

References

1899 establishments in Arkansas
1899 sculptures
Confederate States of America monuments and memorials in Arkansas
Outdoor sculptures in Arkansas
Sculptures of men in Arkansas
Statues in Arkansas